Jouett Shouse (December 10, 1879 – June 2, 1968) was an American lawyer, newspaper publisher, and leading Democratic politician.  A conservative, he was best known for opposing the New Deal in the 1930s.

Born in Midway, Kentucky, his family moved to Mexico, Missouri in 1892 where he attended public school. After studying at the University of Missouri at Columbia he returned to his native Kentucky where he served on the staff of the Lexington Herald from 1898 to 1904 and eventually became the owner/editor of The Kentucky Farmer and Breeder.

In 1911, Jouett Shouse moved to Kinsley, Kansas, where he married. He became involved in agricultural and livestock businesses and served on the board of directors of the director of the Kinsley Bank. He was elected a state senator in 1913 then in 1915 was elected to the United States Congress where he served until 1919 when  President Woodrow Wilson appointed him as Assistant Secretary of the Treasury. At the Treasury Department he was in charge of customs, internal revenue and reorganized the War Risk Insurance division until November 15, 1920 when he resigned "in order to adjust his personal affairs."

Shouse was very active in the Democratic Party and was appointed chairman of the executive committee of the Democratic National Committee in May 1929. His powerful position in Washington politics led to him being on the cover of the November 10, 1930 issue of TIME magazine. He opposed the nomination of Franklin D. Roosevelt as the Democratic Party's candidate for president and along with John J. Raskob supported the candidacy of Alfred E. Smith.

In early 1930s Shouse divorced his wife of twenty-one years and married the wealthy divorcee, Catherine Filene Dodd. A native of Boston, Massachusetts, the new Mrs. Shouse was a daughter of A. Lincoln Filene, head of Filene's department stores. She would serve on the board of trustees of the Filene Foundation. After their marriage, Jouett and Catherine Shouse took in and brought up a boy whom they renamed William Filene Shouse.

Liberty League

After Roosevelt's election, Shouse left his leadership position to become president of the Association Against the Prohibition Amendment. That organization played an important role in bringing about the repeal of prohibition in 1933. In this campaign Shouse worked together with Roosevelt's people.

Shouse broke with the liberals and became the president of the American Liberty League, 1934–40, a new conservative organization formed by leading businessmen to oppose parts of the New Deal. Roosevelt received him in the White House for a generous amount of discussion concerning the group's values and concerns, and he left Shouse charmed. Later, however, Roosevelt told the press that Shouse's organization put "too much stress on property rights, too little on human rights." The League, he said, was sworn to "uphold two of the Ten Commandments".

Regarding the controversial National Recovery Administration, Shouse was ambivalent. He commented that "the NRA has indulged in unwarranted excesses of attempted regulation"; on the other hand, he added that "in many regards [the NRA] has served a useful purpose."  Shouse said that he had "deep sympathy" with the goals of the NRA, explaining, "While I feel very strongly that the prohibition of child labor, the maintenance of a minimum wage and the limitation of the hours of work belong under our form of government in the realm of the affairs of the different states, yet I am entirely willing to agree that in the case of an overwhelming national emergency the Federal Government for a limited period should be permitted to assume jurisdiction of them."

In 1936 Roosevelt built his campaign on crusading against the American Liberty League as a band of economic royalists.

Shouse practiced law in Kansas City, Missouri as well as in Washington, D.C. In 1953, he was appointed chairman of the board of directors of New York City-based Anton Smit and Co. Inc., now part of 3M.

Thoroughbred horse racing
Shouse grew up in Kentucky, where Thoroughbred horse breeding and racing was an integral part of daily life as well as the state's economy. According to a 1916 article in the New York Times, for many years he was actively engaged in promoting the Thoroughbred interests of Kentucky. Shouse and his second wife Catherine owned Wolf Trap Farm in Vienna, Virginia, where they raised and bred  boxer dogs as well as Thoroughbred horses used as show hunters and for competing in flat racing. A part of the farm was later donated by Mrs. Shouse to become the site of the Wolf Trap National Park for the Performing Arts.

Shouse retired in 1965 and died in 1968. He is buried in the Lexington Cemetery in Lexington, Kentucky.

References

Further reading
 Kyvig, David. Repealing National Prohibition. Chicago: University of Chicago Press, 1979.
 Rudolph, Frederick. "The American Liberty League, 1934-1940," American Historical Review 56 (October 1950): 19-33, in JSTOR
 Shamir, Ronen. Managing Legal Uncertainty: Elite Lawyers in the New Deal (Durham, NC: Duke University Press, 1995)
 Wolfskill, George. The Revolt of the Conservatives: A History of the American Liberty League, 1934-1940 (Boston: Houghton Mifflin, 1962)

External links
 The United States Congress biography for Jouett Shouse
 August 15, 1916 New York Times article on Jouett Shouse and Thoroughbred racehorses
 November 10, 1930 TIME magazine cover story on Jouett Shouse
 Information on Jouett Shouse at the Franklin Delano Roosevelt Heritage website
 Guide to the Jouett Shouse papers 1899-1967 housed at the University of Kentucky Libraries Special Collections Research Center

1879 births
1968 deaths
University of Missouri alumni
American lawyers
Democratic Party Kansas state senators
American racehorse owners and breeders
People from Midway, Kentucky
Prohibition in the United States
People from Vienna, Virginia
Democratic Party members of the United States House of Representatives from Kansas
Old Right (United States)
Sportspeople from Fairfax County, Virginia
People from Mexico, Missouri
Filene family